The Hotel Vance, Portland, a Tribute Portfolio Hotel is a 180-room Tribute Portfolio hotel in Portland, Oregon's Broadway Tower.

History
The hotel previously operated as Radisson RED Portland Downtown, opening in 2018 as the Radisson Red brand's second location in the United States. Hotel Vance opened on July 15, 2021, after a brand conversion.

See also
 Beastro

References

External links

 

2018 establishments in Oregon
Hotels in Portland, Oregon
Marriott International
Radisson Hotel Group
Southwest Portland, Oregon